The 2000–01 Tunisian Ligue Professionnelle 1 season was the 75th season of top-tier football in Tunisia.

Results

League table

Result table

Leaders

References
2000–01 Ligue 1 on RSSSF.com

Tunisian Ligue Professionnelle 1 seasons
Tun